Unicorn Glacier is in Mount Rainier National Park in the U.S. state of Washington, on the northwest slope of Unicorn Peak. Unicorn Glacier is a semi-permanent snowfield but is listed on older United States Geological Survey maps.

See also
List of glaciers in the United States

References

Glaciers of Washington (state)
Glaciers of Lewis County, Washington